Smáratorg 3 is an office and retail building in Iceland. It is the tallest building in Iceland, surpassing Hallgrímskirkja in height, and is the fifth tallest architectural structure in the country after the Eiðar longwave transmitter, the masts of Naval Radio Transmitter Facility Grindavik and longwave radio mast Hellissandur.
 
The building is located in Smárahverfi, Kópavogur, where the shopping mall Smáralind is also located. The main constructor for the building was Jáverk. The tower was designed by Arkís architects.

The global accounting and consulting firm Deloitte is located in the tower.

The building opened on 11 February 2008.

See also 
 List of tallest buildings in Iceland

References

External links
 ARKÍS architects official website
 Information and renderings of the building
 News article about a fire on the second floor of the building.(April/2008)
 JÁVERK main constructer official website

Kópavogur
Towers in Iceland
Buildings and structures in Capital Region (Iceland)

Office buildings completed in 2008